The Los Angeles Steamship Company or LASSCO was a passenger and freight shipping company based in Los Angeles, California.

Description
The company, formed in 1920, initially provided fast passenger service between Los Angeles and San Francisco. In 1921, LASSCO added service to Hawaii in competition with the San Francisco-based Matson Navigation Company using two former North German Lloyd ocean liners that had been in U.S. Navy service during World War I. Despite the sinking of one of the former German liners on her maiden voyage for the company, business in the booming 1920s thrived, and the company continued to add ships and services. In 1922, the City of Los Angeles, a renamed and refitted liner, was one of the largest American ships sailing in Pacific waters. The worsening economic conditions in the United States, and the burning of another ship in Hawaii, caused financial problems for the company. After beginning talks in 1930, the Los Angeles Steamship Company was taken over by Matson Navigation on January 1, 1931, but continued to operate as a subsidiary until it ceased operations in 1937.

Ships of the Los Angeles Steamship Company 
This is a list of passenger ships of the Los Angeles Steamship Company:

  (ex USAT Sherman 1899–1922, ex S.S. Mobile of African Steamship Company 1892–1898, Scrapped 1933 at Osaka, Japan)
 SS City of Honolulu (I), sunk in 1922
 SS City of Honolulu (II), burned in 1930

References 

 

Defunct shipping companies of the United States
Los Angeles Harbor Region
Companies based in Los Angeles
American companies established in 1920
Transport companies established in 1920
Transport companies disestablished in 1937
1920 establishments in California
1937 disestablishments in California
Defunct companies based in Greater Los Angeles